Arturo Martínez may refer to:

 Arturo Martínez (judoka) (born 1982), Mexican judoka
 Arturo Martínez (actor) (1919–1992), Mexican actor
 Arturo Martínez Rocha (born 1950), Mexican politician
 Arturo Ortíz Martínez (born 1992), Mexican footballer